Alexander Pringle (30 January 1791 – 2 September 1857) was a Scottish Conservative politician. He was Member of Parliament for Selkirkshire from 1830 to 1832 and again from 1835 to 1846. He was made a Lord of the Treasury in Peel's second ministry, but resigned in 1845 in protest at the decision to enhance the Maynooth Grant. After retiring from parliament he served as Principal Keeper of Sasines until his death.

References

1791 births
1857 deaths
Members of the Parliament of the United Kingdom for Scottish constituencies
UK MPs 1830–1831
UK MPs 1831–1832
UK MPs 1835–1837
UK MPs 1837–1841
UK MPs 1841–1847
Place of birth missing
Scottish Tory MPs (pre-1912)
Tory MPs (pre-1834)